The 2016–17 SPHL season was the 13th season of the Southern Professional Hockey League (SPHL).

League business

Team changes
The dormant Mississippi Surge franchise was purchased and relocated to Roanoke, Virginia, and became the Roanoke Rail Yard Dawgs.
The Evansville Thunderbolts from Evansville, Indiana, join the SPHL as an expansion team replacing the former Evansville IceMen of the ECHL.
The Louisiana IceGators suspended operations because renovations to the Cajundome were not going to be complete in time for the regular season.

Regular season

Standings
Final standings

‡ William B. Coffey Trophy winners
 Advanced to playoffs

Attendance

President's Cup playoffs

Playoff bracket

Finals
Home team is listed first.

Awards

All-SPHL selections

References

External links
Southern Professional Hockey League website

Southern Professional Hockey League seasons
Sphl